Counting of the Omer (Sefirat HaOmer, sometimes abbreviated as Sefira or the Omer) is an important practice in Judaism It consists of a verbal counting of each of the forty-nine days starting with the Wave Offering of a sheaf of ripe grain with a sacrifice immediately following the commencement (Hebrew: , reishit) of the grain harvest, and the First Fruits festival celebrating the end of the grain harvest, known as Shavuot, often translated as the Feast of Weeks. in Mosaic Law (Hebrew Bible:); or in the varying current Jewish holidays tradition, the period between the Passover and Shavuot. 

This mitzvah ("commandment") derives from the Torah commandment to count forty-nine days beginning from the day on which the Omer, a sacrifice containing an omer-measure of barley, was offered in the Temple in Jerusalem, up until the day before an offering of wheat was brought to the Temple on Shavuot. The Counting of the Omer  begins on the second day of Passover (the 16th of Nisan) for Rabbinic Jews (Orthodox, Conservative, Reform), and after the weekly Shabbat during Passover for Karaite Jews, and ends the day before the holiday of Shavuot, the 'fiftieth day.'

The idea of counting each day represents spiritual preparation and anticipation for the giving of the Torah, which God gave on Mount Sinai at the beginning of the month of Sivan, around the same time as the holiday of Shavuot. The Sefer HaChinuch (published anonymously in 13th-century Spain) states that the Israelites were only freed from Egypt at Passover in order to receive the Torah at Sinai, an event which is now celebrated on Shavuot, and to fulfill its laws. The Counting of the Omer demonstrates how much a Jew desires to accept the Torah in their own life.

Sources 

The commandment for counting the Omer is recorded within the Torah in :

As well as in :

However, the obligation in post-Temple destruction times is a matter of some dispute. While Rambam (Maimonides) suggests that the obligation is still biblical, most other commentaries assume that it is of a rabbinic origin in modern times.

Background 

The omer a ("sheaf") is an old Biblical measure of volume of unthreshed stalks of grain. The Sunday after the start of each farmer's barley grain harvest, a sheaf of barley from each farm was waved by a Priest in the Temple in Jerusalem, signalling the allowance of the consumption of chadash (grains from the new harvest).  Later tradition evolved to: during the Feast of Unleavened Bread, an omer of barley was offered in the Temple in Jerusalem, signalling the allowance of the consumption of chadash (grains from the new harvest). This offering happened on "the morrow after the day of rest", evolving to be re-interpreted either as the second day of Unleavened Bread on the 16th day of the month or as the day following the Shabbat during Passover. On the 50th day after the beginning of the count, corresponding to the holiday of Shavuot, two loaves made of wheat were offered in the Temple to signal the end of the wheat harvest or the re-interpreted beginning of the wheat harvest.

The origins of the "omer" count are from the Torah passages on the offerings for the start and end of the grain harvest, with the 50th day marking the official end with a large feast. Shavuot has evolved to be known as the festival marking the giving of the Torah to the Hebrew nation on the 6th of the Hebrew month of Sivan.

Some later rabbinic sources link the omer count to the Israelites' experience in the desert. According to these sources, at the time of the Exodus, Moses announced that 50 days later they would celebrate a religious ceremony at Mount Sinai. The populace was so excited by this that they counted the days until that ceremony took place. Later (according to the sources), when the Temple was destroyed and the omer offering ceased, the rabbis instituted omer counting as a remembrance of the counting up to Sinai.

In keeping with the themes of spiritual growth and character development during this period, Rabbinic literature compares the process of growth to the two types of grain offered at either pole of the counting period. In ancient times, barley was simpler food while wheat was a more luxurious food. At Passover, the children of Israel were raised out of the Egyptian exile although they had sunken almost to the point of no return. The Exodus was an unearned gift from God, like the food of simple creatures that are not expected to develop their spiritual potential. The receiving of the Torah created spiritual elevation and active cooperation. Thus the Shavuot offering is "people food".

The count 

As soon as it is definitely night (approximately thirty minutes after sundown), the one who is counting the Omer recites this blessing:

Then he or she states the Omer-count in terms of both total days and weeks and days. For example, on the 23rd day the count would be stated thus: "Today is twenty-three days, which is three weeks and two days 'of' [or] 'to' (לעומר) [or] 'in' (בעומר) the Omer". The count is said in Hebrew.

According to the Halakha, a person may only recite the blessing while it is still night. If he or she remembers the count the next morning or afternoon, the count may still be made, but without a blessing. If one forgets to count a day altogether, he or she may continue to count succeeding days, but without a blessing. The Omer may be counted in any language, however one must understand what one is saying.

Karaite and Samaritan practice

Karaite Jews and Israelite Samaritans begin counting the Omer on the day after the weekly Sabbath during the Feast of Unleavened Bread – Passover, rather than on the second day of Passover (the 16th of Nisan). There are several reasons for this. On the one hand, Shavuot is the only holiday for which the date is not expressly given in the Torah. Instead, the Torah tells us to determine the date of Shavuot by counting 50 days from the "morrow after the day of rest" (Leviticus 23:15–16).

A difference between Karaites and Samaritans as opposed to Rabbinic Jews is the understanding of "morrow after the day of rest". Rabbinic Jews take the "day of rest" as the 1st day of Passover, while Karaites and Samaritans interpret this Sabbath to be the first weekly Sabbath that falls during Passover. As a result the Karaite and Samaritan Shavuot is always on a Sunday, although the actual Hebrew date varies (which complements the fact that a specific date is never given for Shavuot in the Torah, the only holiday for which this is the case). The counting of Karaite and Rabbinic Jews coincide when the first day of Passover is on the Sabbath. Because the date of the Samaritan Passover usually differs from the Jewish one, often by as much as a month, the Karaite and Samaritan counting rarely coincides.

Other non-Rabbinical religious leaders such as Anan ben David (founder of the Ananites); Benjamin al-Nahawandi (founder of the Benjaminites); Ismail al-Ukbari (founder of a 9th-century messianic Jewish movement in Babylon); Musa of Tiflis (founder of a 9th-century Jewish movement in Babylon); and Malik al Ramli (founder of a 9th-century Jewish movement in the Land of Israel) additionally recognized that Shavuot should fall out on a Sunday.

Catholics and the historical Sadducees and Boethusians, dispute the Rabbinic interpretation. They infer the "Shabbat" referenced is the weekly Shabbat. Accordingly, the counting of the Omer always begins on the Sunday of Passover, and continues for 49 days, so that Shavuot would always fall on a Sunday as well.

Omer-counters

"Omer-counters" are typically offered for sale during this the. They are often on display in synagogues for the benefit of worshippers who count the Omer with the congregation at the conclusion of evening services. Omer-counters come in varying forms such as:
 decorative boxes with an interior scroll that shows each day's count through a small opening
 posters and magnets in which each day's count is recorded on a tear-off piece of paper
 calendars depicting all seven weeks and 49 days of the Omer, on which a small pointer is advanced from day to day
 pegboards that keep track of both the day and the week of the Omer. 

Reminders to count the Omer are also produced for tablet computers and via SMS for mobile phones.

As a period of semi-mourning 

The period of counting the Omer is also a time of semi-mourning. During this time, traditional Jewish custom forbids haircuts, shaving, listening to instrumental music, or conducting weddings, parties, and dinners with dancing. Traditionally, the reason cited is that this is in memory of a plague that killed the 24,000 students of Rabbi Akiva (ca. 40–ca. 137 CE). According to the Talmud,  12,000 chavruta (pairs of Torah study partners), 24,000 in all, were killed (they were either killed by the Romans during the Bar Kokhba revolt 132–136 CE or they died in a "plague") as a sign of Divine anger during the days of the Omer-counting for not honoring one another properly as befits Torah scholars.

Lag BaOmer, the thirty-third day of the Counting of the Omer, is considered to be the day in which the plague was lifted, (and/or the day in which the rebellion saw a victory during the uprising of Bar Kochba) so on that day, all the rules of mourning are lifted.

Some Sephardi Jews however, continue the mourning period up until the 34th day of the Omer, which is considered by them to be the day of joy and celebration. Spanish and Portuguese Jews do not observe these customs. Some religious Jews shave each Friday afternoon during the mourning period of the Omer in order to be neat in honor of the Shabbat, and some men do so in order to appear neat in their places of employment.

In practice, different Jewish communities observe different periods of mourning. Some families listen to music during the week of Passover and then commence the period of mourning until Lag BaOmer. Some Sephardic Jewish families begin the period of mourning from the first day of the Hebrew month of Iyar and continue for thirty-three days until the third of Sivan. The custom among Jerusalemites (minhag Yerushalmi) is to follow the mourning practices during the entire Counting of the Omer, save for the day of Lag BaOmer and the last three days of the counting (sheloshet yemei hagbalah) prior to the onset of Shavuot. The extent of mourning is also based heavily on family custom, and therefore Jews will mourn to different degrees.

Rabbi Yechiel Michel Epstein (1829–1908), author of Aruch HaShulchan, postulates that the mourning period also memorializes Jews who were murdered during the Crusades (the 11th-, 12th- and 13th-century religious military campaigns), pogroms (19th- and 20th-century attacks on Jews in the Russian Empire) and blood libels that occurred in Europe.  In modern times, the Holocaust is generally included among those events which are memorialized, in particular Yom Hashoah is observed during the Omer.

The Jewish calendar is largely agricultural, and the period of Omer falls between Passover and Shavuot. On Passover there is a shift from praying for rain to praying for dew and this coincides with the growth period for the fruit of the season. Shavuot is the day of the giving of the first fruits (bikkurim). The outcome of the season's crop and fruit was still vulnerable during this period. Over these seven weeks, daily reflection, work on improving one's personality characteristics (middot) and potential inner growth from this work on one self was one way to pray for and invite the possibility of affecting one's external fate and potential – the growth of the crop and the fruit of that season.

Although the period of the Omer is traditionally a mourning one, on Lag BaOmer Jews can do actions that are not allowed during mourning. Many Religious Zionists trim their beards or shave their growth, and do other actions that are typically not allowed during the mourning period, on Yom Ha'atzmaut (Israel's Independence Day).

Lag BaOmer 

According to some Rishonim, it is the day on which the plague that killed Rabbi Akiva's 24,000 disciples came to an end, and for this reason the mourning period of Sefirat HaOmer concludes on Lag BaOmer in many communities.

According to modern kabbalistic tradition, this day is the Celebration of Simeon ben Yochai and/or the anniversary of his death. According to a late medieval tradition, Simeon ben Yochai is buried in Meron, and this association has spawned several well-known customs and practices on Lag BaOmer, including the lighting of bonfires and pilgrimages to Meron.

Kabbalistic interpretation 

The period of the counting of the Omer is considered to be a time of potential for inner growth – for a person to work on one's good characteristics (middot) through reflection and development of one aspect each day for the 49 days of the counting.

In Kabbalah, each of the seven weeks of the Omer-counting is associated with one of the seven lower sefirot:

Chesed (loving-kindness)
Gevurah (might)
Tipheret (beauty)
Netzach (victory)
Hod (acknowledgment)
Yesod (foundation)
Malchut (kingdom)

Each day of each week is also associated with one of these same seven sefirot, creating forty-nine permutations. The first day of the Omer is therefore associated with "chesed that is in chesed" (loving-kindness within loving-kindness), the second day with "gevurah that is in chesed" (might within loving-kindness); the first day of the second week is associated with "chesed that is in gevurah" (loving-kindness within might), the second day of the second week with "gevurah that is in gevurah" (might within might), and so on.

Symbolically, each of these 49 permutations represents an aspect of each person's character that can be improved or further developed. Rabbi Simon Jacobson (b. 1956), a Chabad Hasidic teacher, explains these 49 levels in his book, The Spiritual Guide to Counting the Omer, as do Rabbi Yaacov Haber and Rabbi David Sedley in their book Sefiros: Spiritual Refinement through Counting the Omer. A meditative approach is that of Rabbi Min Kantrowitz in Counting the Omer: A Kabbalistic Meditation Guide which includes meditations, activities and kavvanot (proper mindset) for each of the kabbalistic four worlds for each of the 49 days.

The forty-nine-day period of counting the Omer is also a conducive time to study the teaching of the Mishnah in Pirkei Avoth 6:6, which enumerates the "48 ways" by which Torah is acquired. Rabbi Aharon Kotler (1891–1962) explains that the study of each "way" can be done on each of the first forty-eight days of the Omer-counting; on the forty-ninth day, one should review all the "ways."

Observance in Christianity
Most Christian sects do not observe The Omer. The Christian holiday of Pentecost is named after Shavuot with similar timing but it otherwise unrelated.

See also
 Bible code, a purported set of secret messages encoded within the Torah.
 Biblical and Talmudic units of measurement
 Chol HaMoed, the intermediate days during Passover and Sukkot.
 Chronology of the Bible
 Gematria, Jewish system of assigning numerical value to a word or phrase.
 Hebrew calendar
 Hebrew numerals
 Jewish and Israeli holidays 2000–2050
 Lag BaOmer, 33rd day of counting the Omer.
 Notarikon, a method of deriving a word by using each of its initial letters.
 Sephirot, the 10 attributes/emanations found in Kabbalah.
 Significance of numbers in Judaism
 Weekly Torah portion, division of the Torah into 54 portions.

References

Works cited

External links

 Sefirat ha'omer/Counting the Omer, by Rabbi Julian Sinclair, April 28, 2011; Jewish Chronicle Online
 Encyclopedia Judaica on Jewish Virtual Library
 Spiritual practices and reflections for each day from Mishkan Tefilah
 The traditional liturgy from Chabad
 Rabbi Eliezer Melamed – Peninei Halakha – Counting the Omer
 Rabbi Yitzchak Ginsburgh - Short video teachings for each day of the Omer

manuscripts about the counting of the Omer 
 Secret of the Counting of the Omer, Moses of Burgos, 13th - 14th centuries, Ktiv project, National Library of Israel
 Seder Sefireat HaOmer, Amsterdam, 1795, Ktiv project, National Library of Israel
 Kavanot for the Counting of the Omer, Amsterdam, 18th century, Ktiv project, National Library of Israel
 Kabbalist Seder of the Counting of the Omer, 1782, Italy, Ktiv project, National Library of Israel

Iyar observances
Lag BaOmer
Nisan observances
Passover
Shavuot
Tabernacle and Temples in Jerusalem
Positive Mitzvoth